Caballos de Coclé (in English: Coclé Horses) is a Panamanian basketball club based in Aguadulce in the Coclé Province. The team plays in the Liga Profesional de Baloncesto (LPB). The home arena of the team is the Gymnasio Municipal de Aguadulce. The Caballos has won one LPB championship, in 2019.

The Cablalos made their debut in international competition during the 2017 FIBA Americas League, finishing third in Group B. The club played in the 2020–21 season of the BCL Americas and reached the quarterfinals. Home games were played in Panama City in the Roberto Durán Arena.

Honours
Liga Profesional de Baloncesto
Champions (1): 2019
Runners-up (2): 2016, 2017

References

Basketball teams in Panama
Basketball teams established in 2015
2015 establishments in Panama